Christopher J. Mahoney is a United States Marine Corps lieutenant general who serves as the Deputy Commandant for Programs and Resources since August 2021. He most recently served as the Commanding General of the 3rd Marine Aircraft Wing from July 24, 2020 to July 30, 2021. Previously, he was the Deputy Commander of the United States Forces Japan.

Born in South Weymouth, Massachusetts, Mahoney graduated from the College of the Holy Cross in June 1987 with a Bachelor of Arts degree in economics and was commissioned through the Naval Reserve Officers Training Corps program. After flight training, he was designated a naval aviator in May 1990. Mahoney later earned a master's degree in management from the University of Canberra in December 2001 and a second master's degree in international strategic relations from the Air War College in May 2007.

References

Air War College alumni
College of the Holy Cross alumni
Living people
People from Weymouth, Massachusetts
Recipients of the Defense Superior Service Medal
Recipients of the Legion of Merit
United States Marine Corps generals
United States Marine Corps personnel of the Iraq War
United States Naval Aviators
University of Canberra alumni
Year of birth missing (living people)